MEG3 (maternally expressed 3) is a maternally expressed, imprinted long non-coding RNA gene. At least 12 different isoforms of MEG3 are generated by alternative splicing. Expression of MEG3 is lost in cancer cells. It acts as a growth suppressor in tumour cells, and activates p53. A pituitary transcript variant has been associated with inhibited cell proliferation. Studies in mouse and sheep suggest that an upstream intergenic differentially methylated region (IG-DMR) regulates imprinting of the region. The expression profile in mouse of the co-regulated Meg3 and Dlk1 genes suggests a causative role in the pathologies found in uniparental disomy animals, characterized by defects in skeletal muscle maturation, bone formation, placenta size and organization and prenatal lethality. The sheep homolog is associated with the callipyge mutation which in heterozygous individuals affects a muscle-specific long-range control element located in the DLK1-GTL2 intergenic region and results in the callipyge muscular hypertrophy. The non-Mendelian inheritance pattern, known as polar overdominance, likely results from the combination of the cis-effect on the expression levels of genes in the DLK1-GTL2 imprinted domain, and trans interaction between the products of reciprocally imprinted genes.

See also 
 Long noncoding RNA

References

Further reading 

 
 
 
 

Non-coding RNA